Marion Bernstein (1846–1906)  was a radical feminist poet who lived most of her life in Glasgow.

Biography
Bernstein was born in London in 1846 to Theodore Bernstein, a Jewish emigrant from Germany and Lydia Pulsford, an Anglican mother from Marylebone. She suffered from debilitating infirmity in her childhood, and suffered illness throughout her adult life. By 1874, she had moved to Glasgow with her widowed mother, her brother, her married sister, and her brother-in-law. In Glasgow, she supported herself by teaching piano lessons.

Poetry
Bernstein is commonly remembered for writing a number of radically feminist poems, for example 'The Wretched Sex', 'A Woman's Logic' and 'Wanted Husband'. Much of her work was published in newspapers printed in Glasgow, most notably the Glasgow Weekly Mail. Her only published book of poetry, Mirren's Musings, was published in 1876. Interest in Bernstein was revived following her inclusion in Tom Leonard's 'Radical Renfrew', an edited collection of poems by Scottish writers who had been largely forgotten.

In her 1878 poem 'The Govan Rivetter's Strike', Berstein was strongly critical of a strike called by a group of Clyde shipbuilders, leading Tom Leonard to remark that: 'A radical in one tradition might be conservative in another. Marion Bernstein, though a pioneering feminist in her work, attacked Govan shipyard workers for striking'.

Legacy
After the revival of her work in the 1990s, Bernstein's works were included in several prominent critical studies of Scottish poetry, such as Mungo’s Tongues, Glasgow Poets Past and Present, A History of Scottish Women’s Writing, The New Penguin Book of Scottish Verse, and The Edinburgh History of Scottish Literature. However, a significant portion of her work remained unpublished.

In 2013, Bernstein's collected poems were published as A Song of Glasgow Town. This collection included poems from Mirren's Musings, as well as several poems published elsewhere and fifteen previously unpublished works.

Selected works
 Mirren's Musings (1876)

References

See also
 List of feminist poets

1846 births
1906 deaths
Scottish feminists
Scottish Jews
Scottish people of German-Jewish descent
Scottish women poets
Jewish feminists
Jewish poets
19th-century Scottish poets
19th-century British women writers
19th-century British writers